Kingpin or king pin may refer to:

Vehicular part
 Kingpin (automotive part), the pivot in the steering mechanism
 The central bolt of a skateboard, axle assembly ("truck"), around which the rest of the mechanism can flex, allowing the rider to steer by shifting body weight
 The pivot or connector between a tractor and trailer in the fifth-wheel coupling of semi-trailer truck
 The pivot in a railway car bogie

Crime
 Crime boss, in organized crime
 More specifically, a drug lord

Literature
 Kingpin (book), a book written by former hacker Kevin Poulsen
 Kingpin (chess magazine), a satirical chess magazine
 Kingpin (character), a fictional supervillain in the Marvel Universe
 Kingpin (Ashley Barton), an alternate version of Kingpin on Earth-807128/21923
 Kingpin (Matt Murdock), an alternate version of Kingpin on Earth-65

Film and television
 Kingpin (1985 film), a 1985 New Zealand drama film by Mike Walker
 Kingpin (1996 film), a 1996 sports comedy film by the Farrelly brothers
 Kingpin (TV series), a 2003 crime/drama TV miniseries

Music

Bands
 Kingpin (band), a Swedish metal band from the mid-1980s
 The Kingpins (Canadian band), a Canadian ska band
 The Kingpins (English vocal group), an English pop group of the 1950s and 1960s
 The Kingpins, band of King Curtis which frequently backed Aretha Franklin
 The Kingpins, London band which toured with Albert Lee in 1969
 The King Pins, American R&B vocal group also known as the Kelly Brothers

Albums
 Kingpin (1996 film), soundtrack to the 1996 film of the same name
 The Kingpin (album), a 1989 album by Craig G
 Kingpin (Tinsley Ellis album), a 2000 album by Tinsley Ellis

Songs
 "Kingpin", a song from the Wilco album Being There

Other media
 Kingpin: Life of Crime, a 1999 video game

See also
 Kingpin Bowling, lounge bars in Australia
 Operation Kingpin (disambiguation)
 
 
 KPRA (disambiguation)